Time Cruise (known as Time Cruise II in Japan) is a science fiction themed pinball video game developed by Face for the PC Engine/TurboGrafx-16 game system, released on November 8, 1991 in Japan and December 1992 in the United States.

Plot 
Time Cruise's plot centers around Eric, a young scientific genius. Eric learns the secret of time travel by channeling with an intelligent extraterrestrial lifeform. After 8 years of hard work, Eric completes his time travel system (seven buildings with a time-travel pod moving between them at high speeds) and sets off in his shining silver time travel pod to explore the limits of time and space.

Gameplay
The Time Cruise playfield consists of seven screens and scrolls both horizontally and vertically. The player can nudge the table to influence the ball's path, but doing this too many times can cause a tilt condition, resulting in a lost ball. Scattered around the playfield are five different time travel switches. Hitting a switch with the ball activates its corresponding time travel mechanism, and landing the ball in an activated mechanism causes a time warp to take place. These alternate times range from a prehistoric sea floor in 460,000,000 B.C. to an orbiting Mars colony in 2054, and take the form of bonus stages where the player can earn points and extra balls. Occasionally, due to flaws in the time travel system the player will be brought to an alternate dimension (a sixth bonus stage) rather than the time period they intended to warp to. The game ends either when the player loses all of their balls, or when they attain a score of 99,999,999 which causes an ending cut-scene and the game's credits to be displayed.

Critical reception
In the United Kingdom, Time Cruise was the top-selling PC Engine game in November 1991.

In March 1993, the critic Otter Matic of GamePro magazine praised Time Cruise for its visuals and controls, but heavily criticized the game's audio and soundtrack as the weakest aspect of the game. The game received perfect scores of 5 out of 5 for graphics, control, and fun factor, but only 1.5 out of 5 for sound.

References

Face (company) games
1991 video games
Pinball video games
TurboGrafx-16 games
TurboGrafx-16-only games
Video games about time travel
Video games developed in Japan
Single-player video games